Merrifieldia calcarius is a moth of the family Pterophoridae. It is found in eastern Russia, Turkmenistan, Iran and Turkey.

References

Moths described in 1870
calcarius
Moths of Asia